David Bowie: Sound and Vision is a 2002 documentary film about the English musician, made by the American television network A&E for their long running documentary television series and media franchise Biography. It was first broadcast on A&E on 4 November 2002. It was released as a DVD the following year.

After the BBC's Omnibus produced Cracked Actor (1975), and the self-produced Ricochet (1984) and Black Tie White Noise (1993), the film is the fourth official music documentary sanctioned by David Bowie. While there are major differences in the format of these three previous films, their common trait is that they focus upon Bowie at the time in which the film is being made; David Bowie: Sound and Vision was rather the first full career (so-far, at time of release) retrospective biography. It was produced during 2002 as Bowie was completing and releasing the album Heathen.

Background
Biography is an American documentary television series and media franchise created in the early 1960s by David Wolper. Each episode depicts the life of a notable person with narration, on-camera interviews, photographs, and stock footage. The show originally ran in syndication in 1962–1964, on CBS in 1979, on A&E from 1987. In 2002 the series made an episode on Bowie, who had just completed his album Heathen, and was preparing for its release. While Bowie did not take part in the documentary in any way, he endorsed the programme, and his wife Iman and many of his friends and collaborators were filmed being interviewed. Narration was provided by the Welsh actor Jonathan Pryce from a script by director Rick Hull. The programme was released on DVD the following year, dropping the series title Biography.

Bowie: Sound & Vision covers Bowie’s life from his birth in 1947 to 2002. It includes interview footage previously filmed from many periods of Bowie's career, from an interview with his band The Manish Boys (when still called David Jones) in 1964, to an interview recorded in 1999 around the time of the hours... album. There is also footage taken from live performances, music videos and Bowie's film acting. The interviews include childhood friends, music collaborators and producers.

Reception
Reviewing the documentary in 2019, Albumism wrote: ‘A thorough primer on the late great Bowie’s career progression and the bold, brave transformations that defined his musical repertoire and public persona through the release of 2002’s Heathen. Nicolas Pegg, author of The Complete David Bowie, writes on the film: 'Despite a few gaps and inexactitudes it's a good solid account of Bowie's career' with a 'wealth of rare archive material'.

Rerelease
The DVD was rereleased in 2013 remastered in Dolby Digital 5.1.

Content

The DVD release is organised into ten named chapters, which follows the original fade-outs for advertising breaks during television transmission. Interviews with everyone except Bowie were filmed for the documentary. Interviews with Bowie are archive footage from the following sources (where known):

Davie Jones with band The Manish Boys on BBC Tonight with Cliff Michelmore (1964).
David Bowie BBC Nationwide report by Bernard Falk (5 June 1973).
Cracked Actor by Alan Yentob for BBC Omnibus (26 January 1975).
David Bowie interviewed by Alan Yentob for BBC Arena (1978).
David Bowie Unknown Earthling era interview (1997).
David Bowie interviewed by Tim Rice for BBC Friday Night, Saturday Morning (10 October 1980).
David Bowie Unknown Let's Dance era interview (1983).
David Bowie speaks to Jeremy Paxman on BBC Newsnight (1999).

References
General

Pegg, Nicholas (2016) [2000]. The Complete David Bowie (7th edition). London: Titan Books. 

Specific

2002 films
Rockumentaries
Documentary films about singers
David Bowie
2002 documentary films
David Bowie video albums
2000s English-language films